Lori Sue Kornblum is an American lawyer and judge, who recently served as a judge of the Wisconsin Court of Appeals in the Waukesha-based District II.  She was appointed in 2021 by Governor Tony Evers.

Biography
Lori Kornblum received her undergraduate education from Yale University and graduated magna cum laude in 1979.  She went on to attend UC Berkeley School of Law and earned her J.D. in 1982.  Following her graduation, she was admitted to the State Bar of Wisconsin and was employed as a law clerk for Wisconsin Supreme Court judge Shirley Abrahamson, serving through the 1982–1983 court term.

After a few years in private legal practice, in 1992, she went to work as an assistant district attorney in Milwaukee County, Wisconsin.  During her 22 years with the district attorney's office, she specialized in child protection, sexual assault, and juvenile justice cases.

She returned to private practice in 2014, specializing in cases of child abuse, disability rights, and parental rights.

Since 2008, she has also worked an adjunct professor at Milwaukee Area Technical College, Marquette University Law School, and Northeastern University Law School.

On November 30, 2021, Governor Tony Evers announced he would appoint Kornblum to the Wisconsin Court of Appeals to replace retiring judge Paul F. Reilly.  She took office January 3, 2022, and stood for election to a full term in the 2022 Spring general election. She lost the election to Maria S. Lazar.

References

External links
 Campaign website
 Law Offices of Lori S. Kornblum

Date of birth missing (living people)
Living people
People from Mequon, Wisconsin
Yale University alumni
UC Berkeley School of Law alumni
Wisconsin lawyers
Marquette University faculty
Northeastern University faculty
Milwaukee Area Technical College people
Wisconsin Court of Appeals judges
21st-century American women judges
21st-century American judges
Year of birth missing (living people)